James Docherty (born 8 November 1956) is a Scottish former footballer, who played as a striker.

Career
Docherty began his short professional career with East Stirlingshire, where a prolific spell saw him sign for Chelsea in a club record £45,000 deal, which is still a club record transfer to this day. Just three games into his Chelsea career, Docherty left to join Dundee United on a free transfer in October 1979, but then subsequently left after playing only two matches. A further short time with Hearts preceded a spell with St Johnstone, where Docherty played just under fifty league matches. After leaving Perth, Docherty had short spells with Partick Thistle, Meadowbank Thistle (on loan) and Dunfermline Athletic. His professional career, which ended in his late twenties, lasted seven years.

References

External links

1956 births
Living people
Scottish footballers
East Stirlingshire F.C. players
Chelsea F.C. players
Dundee United F.C. players
Heart of Midlothian F.C. players
St Johnstone F.C. players
Partick Thistle F.C. players
Livingston F.C. players
Dunfermline Athletic F.C. players
Scottish Football League players
English Football League players
Sportspeople from Broxburn, West Lothian
Footballers from West Lothian
Fauldhouse United F.C. players
Whitburn Junior F.C. players
Scottish Junior Football Association players
Association football forwards